Milje is a village in the Municipality of Šenčur in the Upper Carniola region of Slovenia.

References

External links
Milje at Geopedia

Populated places in the Municipality of Šenčur